Barry Lakin (born 19 December 1973) is an English former professional footballer who played in the Football League as a midfielder. He was appointed manager of Stanway Rovers in January 2013.

References

1973 births
Living people
Sportspeople from Dartford
English footballers
Association football midfielders
Leyton Orient F.C. players
Welling United F.C. players
Helsingin Jalkapalloklubi players
Chelmsford City F.C. players
Boreham Wood F.C. players
Deal Town F.C. players
Enfield F.C. players
Maldon & Tiptree F.C. players
Heybridge Swifts F.C.
English Football League players
National League (English football) players
English football managers
Erith & Belvedere F.C. managers
Stanway Rovers F.C. managers
Chelmsford City F.C. non-playing staff
Association football coaches